Time for the Dancers (also released as At Home with Friends) is an album by pianist Roland Hanna recorded in New York in 1977 and released by the Progressive label.

Reception

AllMusic reviewer Scott Yanow stated: "The interplay between the players, the wide variety of moods covered, and the general swinging feel of the music makes this a recommended set".

Track listing
All compositions by Roland Hanna except where noted
 "Cheryl" (Charlie Parker) – 9:39
 "Time for the Dancers" – 7:55
 "Flight to Ann's Ville" – 5:43
 "Ode to a Potato Plant" – 7:47
 "Jed" (George Mraz) – 6:58
 "Double Intentions" – 8:30

Personnel 
Roland Hanna – piano
George Mraz – bass
Richard Pratt – drums

References 

1977 albums
Progressive Records albums
Roland Hanna albums